"Apples and Bananas" is an instrumental composition released by Lawrence Welk and His Orchestra in 1965. The single spent 4 weeks on the Billboard Hot 100 chart, peaking at No. 75, while reaching No. 17 on Billboards Middle-Road Singles chart. "Apples and Bananas" was most successful in Chicago, where it reached No. 11 on WLS's "Silver Dollar Survey".

"Apples and Bananas" was the lead song of an album by the same name released by Lawrence Welk and His Orchestra in 1965, which spent 12 weeks on Billboards chart of Top LPs, peaking at No. 57.

Chart performance

References

1965 singles
Dot Records singles
Pop instrumentals
1960s instrumentals
1965 songs